Ambalpady is a holy place in the surroundings of Udupi City, the land of Lord Sri Krishna. With the ancient Sri Janardana temple having Mahakali mandir by the side, Janardana pushkarani in the front, an Anjaneya temple with an idol incorporating incarnations of Mukhyaprana, and a Brandavan of Raghavendra Swamji in the surroundings, it has been growing as a religious  and cultural centre in the coastal belt of Karnataka State.

With the Sri Krishna temple  to the east and the holy beach where Sri Madhwacharya got the idol of Lord Krishna to the west, Ambalpady is situated about 2 miles away from Udupi bus-stand. Janardana is the presiding deity of Ambalpady.

To his southeast is goddess Mahakali who is worshiped with greater ardour. This is common as children go more often to their mother than to their father and confess their mother knowing for help.  With the same belief, devotees come to goddess Mahakali to be relieved of their sins and get solution to their problems. There is one more reason for  her dominance here. She had come earlier to this place to protect the land, and the place got its name because of  her.

Ambalpady is ‘Ammana Padi’, or the ‘Woods of Amma’. It is believed that initially goddess Mahakali was worshipped in a stone.  The same stone is being worshiped even now along with the  wooden idol of Mahakali. Thus, Mahakali was worshiped earlier in this region and Janardana Swamy came here in search of the goddess and decided to stay here and protect devotees.  Some knowledge of the history of Ambalpady is very essential to know about the goddess and Lord Janardana.

References

Udupi
Hindu pilgrimage sites in India
Hindu temples in Udupi district